Danai Udomchoke was the defending champion but decided not to participate.
John Millman defeated Stéphane Robert 6–2, 4–6, 6–0 in the final to win the title.

Seeds

Draw

Finals

Top half

Bottom half

References
 Main Draw
 Qualifying Draw

McDonald's Burnie International - Singles
2013 Singles
2013 in Australian tennis